Jürgen Harpke (February 15, 1943 – December 2, 2010) was an East German sprint canoer who competed in the late 1960s. He finished sixth in the C-2 1000 m event at the 1968 Summer Olympics in Mexico City.

References
Jürgen Harpke's profile at Sports Reference.com
Jürgen Harpke's obituary 

1943 births
2010 deaths
Canoeists at the 1968 Summer Olympics
German male canoeists
Olympic canoeists of East Germany